The Breitenbeek is a roughly  river of Lower Saxony, in the Harz Mountains of central Germany. It is a tributary of the Sperrlutter . It then flows initially southwards through the Engelsburger Teiche, before it joins the Sperrlutter at 360 m. The Breitenbeek is the largest tributary of the Sperrlutter.

Gallery

See also 
List of rivers of Lower Saxony

Rivers of Lower Saxony
Rivers of the Harz
Rivers of Germany